Olea chimanimani is an olive shrub or small tree, growing 2–3 meters tall, in the family Oleaceae. It is found only in the Chimanimani Mountains (whence its name), which lay on the border dividing Mozambique and Zimbabwe. Confined only to a relatively small (600 km2) area, it is locally common, growing in scrub vegetation among quartzite cliffs.

References

chimanimani
Plants described in 1979
Flora of Mozambique
Flora of Zimbabwe
Vulnerable plants
Taxonomy articles created by Polbot